Lilly Stepanek (1912–2004) was an Austrian stage actress who worked at the Burgtheater in Vienna for many years. She also starred in a handful of films such as the 1951 production Vienna Waltzes.

Selected filmography
  (1947)
 Vienna Waltzes (1951)
 The Last Ten Days (1955)
 Vienna, City of My Dreams (1957)

References

Bibliography
 Fritsche, Maria. Homemade Men in Postwar Austrian Cinema: Nationhood, Genre and Masculinity. Berghahn Books, 2013.

External links

1912 births
2004 deaths
Austrian film actresses
Austrian stage actresses
Actresses from Vienna